A document-oriented database, or document store, is a computer program and data storage system designed for storing, retrieving and managing document-oriented information, also known as semi-structured data.

Document-oriented databases are one of the main categories of NoSQL databases, and the popularity of the term "document-oriented database" has grown with the use of the term NoSQL itself. XML databases are a subclass of document-oriented databases that are optimized to work with XML documents. Graph databases are similar, but add another layer, the relationship, which allows them to link documents for rapid traversal.

Document-oriented databases are inherently a subclass of the key-value store, another NoSQL database concept. The difference lies in the way the data is processed; in a key-value store, the data is considered to be inherently opaque to the database, whereas a document-oriented system relies on internal structure in the document in order to extract metadata that the database engine uses for further optimization. Although the difference is often negligible due to tools in the systems, conceptually the document-store is designed to offer a richer experience with modern programming techniques.

Document databases contrast strongly with the traditional relational database (RDB). Relational databases generally store data in separate tables that are defined by the programmer, and a single object may be spread across several tables. Document databases store all information for a given object in a single instance in the database, and every stored object can be different from every other. This eliminates the need for object-relational mapping while loading data into the database.

Documents 
The central concept of a document-oriented database is the notion of a document. While each document-oriented database implementation differs on the details of this definition, in general, they all assume documents encapsulate and encode data (or information) in some standard format or encoding. Encodings in use include XML, YAML, JSON, as well as binary forms like BSON.

Documents in a document store are roughly equivalent to the programming concept of an object. They are not required to adhere to a standard schema, nor will they have all the same sections, slots, parts or keys. Generally, programs using objects have many different types of objects, and those objects often have many optional fields. Every object, even those of the same class, can look very different. Document stores are similar in that they allow different types of documents in a single store, allow the fields within them to be optional, and often allow them to be encoded using different encoding systems. For example, the following is a document, encoded in JSON:

{
    "FirstName": "Bob", 
    "Address": "5 Oak St.", 
    "Hobby": "sailing"
}

A second document might be encoded in XML as:
  <contact>
    <firstname>Bob</firstname>
    <lastname>Smith</lastname>
    <phone type="Cell">(123) 555-0178</phone>
    <phone type="Work">(890) 555-0133</phone>
    <address>
      <type>Home</type>
      <street1>123 Back St.</street1>
      <city>Boys</city>
      <state>AR</state>
      <zip>32225</zip>
      <country>US</country>
    </address>
  </contact>

These two documents share some structural elements with one another, but each also has unique elements. The structure and text and other data inside the document are usually referred to as the document's content and may be referenced via retrieval or editing methods, (see below). Unlike a relational database where every record contains the same fields, leaving unused fields empty; there are no empty 'fields' in either document (record) in the above example. This approach allows new information to be added to some records without requiring that every other record in the database share the same structure.

Document databases typically provide for additional metadata to be associated with and stored along with the document content. That metadata may be related to facilities the datastore provides for organizing documents, providing security, or other implementation specific features.

CRUD operations 
The core operations that a document-oriented database supports for documents are similar to other databases, and while the terminology is not perfectly standardized, most practitioners will recognize them as CRUD:

 Creation (or insertion)
 Retrieval (or query, search, read or find)
 Update (or edit)
 Deletion (or removal)

Keys 
Documents are addressed in the database via a unique key that represents that document. This key is a simple identifier (or ID), typically a string, a URI, or a path. The key can be used to retrieve the document from the database. Typically the database retains an index on the key to speed up document retrieval, and in some cases the key is required to create or insert the document into the database.

Retrieval 
Another defining characteristic of a document-oriented database is that, beyond the simple key-to-document lookup that can be used to retrieve a document, the database offers an API or query language that allows the user to retrieve documents based on content (or metadata). For example, you may want a query that retrieves all the documents with a certain field set to a certain value.  The set of query APIs or query language features available, as well as the expected performance of the queries, varies significantly from one implementation to another. Likewise, the specific set of indexing options and configuration that are available vary greatly by implementation.

It is here that the document store varies most from the key-value store. In theory, the values in a key-value store are opaque to the store, they are essentially black boxes. They may offer search systems similar to those of a document store, but may have less understanding about the organization of the content. Document stores use the metadata in the document to classify the content, allowing them, for instance, to understand that one series of digits is a phone number, and another is a postal code. This allows them to search on those types of data, for instance, all phone numbers containing 555, which would ignore the zip code 55555.

Editing 
Document databases typically provide some mechanism for updating or editing the content (or metadata) of a document, either by allowing for replacement of the entire document, or individual structural pieces of the document.

Organization 
Document database implementations offer a variety of ways of organizing documents, including notions of

 Collections: groups of documents, where depending on implementation, a document may be enforced to live inside one collection, or may be allowed to live in multiple collections
 Tags and non-visible metadata: additional data outside the document content 
 Directory hierarchies: groups of documents organized in a tree-like structure, typically based on path or URI

Sometimes these organizational notions vary in how much they are logical vs physical, (e.g. on disk or in memory), representations.

Relationship to other databases

Relationship to key-value stores 

A document-oriented database is a specialized key-value store, which itself is another NoSQL database category.  In a simple key-value store, the document content is opaque. A document-oriented database provides APIs or a query/update language that exposes the ability to query or update based on the internal structure in the document. This difference may be minor for users that do not need richer query, retrieval, or editing APIs that are typically provided by document databases. Modern key-value stores often include features for working with metadata, blurring the lines between document stores.

Relationship to search engines 
Some search engine (aka information retrieval) systems like Apache Solr and Elasticsearch provide enough of the core operations on documents to fit the definition of a document-oriented database.

Relationship to relational databases 

In a relational database, data is first categorized into a number of predefined types, and tables are created to hold individual entries, or records, of each type. The tables define the data within each record's fields, meaning that every record in the table has the same overall form. The administrator also defines the relationships between the tables, and selects certain fields that they believe will be most commonly used for searching and defines indexes on them. A key concept in the relational design is that any data that may be repeated is normally placed in its own table, and if these instances are related to each other, a column is selected to group them together, the foreign key. This design is known as database normalization.

For example, an address book application will generally need to store the contact name, an optional image, one or more phone numbers, one or more mailing addresses, and one or more email addresses. In a canonical relational database, tables would be created for each of these rows with predefined fields for each bit of data: the CONTACT table might include FIRST_NAME, LAST_NAME and IMAGE columns, while the PHONE_NUMBER table might include COUNTRY_CODE, AREA_CODE, PHONE_NUMBER and TYPE (home, work, etc.). The PHONE_NUMBER table also contains a foreign key column, "CONTACT_ID", which holds the unique ID number assigned to the contact when it was created. In order to recreate the original contact, the database engine uses the foreign keys to look for the related items across the group of tables and reconstruct the original data.

In contrast, in a document-oriented database there may be no internal structure that maps directly onto the concept of a table, and the fields and relationships generally don't exist as predefined concepts. Instead, all of the data for an object is placed in a single document, and stored in the database as a single entry. In the address book example, the document would contain the contact's name, image, and any contact info, all in a single record. That entry is accessed through its key, which allows the database to retrieve and return the document to the application. No additional work is needed to retrieve the related data; all of this is returned in a single object.

A key difference between the document-oriented and relational models is that the data formats are not predefined in the document case. In most cases, any sort of document can be stored in any database, and those documents can change in type and form at any time. If one wishes to add a COUNTRY_FLAG to a CONTACT, this field can be added to new documents as they are inserted, this will have no effect on the database or the existing documents already stored. To aid retrieval of information from the database, document-oriented systems generally allow the administrator to provide hints to the database to look for certain types of information. These work in a similar fashion to indexes in the relational case. Most also offer the ability to add additional metadata outside of the content of the document itself, for instance, tagging entries as being part of an address book, which allows the programmer to retrieve related types of information, like "all the address book entries". This provides functionality similar to a table, but separates the concept (categories of data) from its physical implementation (tables).

In the classic normalized relational model, objects in the database are represented as separate rows of data with no inherent structure beyond that given to them as they are retrieved. This leads to problems when trying to translate programming objects to and from their associated database rows, a problem known as object-relational impedance mismatch. Document stores more closely, or in some cases directly, map programming objects into the store. These are often marketed using the term NoSQL.

Implementations

XML database implementations

Most XML databases are document-oriented databases.

See also 
 Database theory
 Data hierarchy
 Data analysis
 Full-text search
 In-memory database
 Internet Message Access Protocol (IMAP)
 Machine-readable document
 Multi-model database
 NoSQL
 Object database
 Online database
 Real-time database
 Relational database
 Content management system

Notes

References

Further reading
 Assaf Arkin. (2007, September 20). Read Consistency: Dumb Databases, Smart Services.

External links
 DB-Engines Ranking of Document Stores by popularity, updated monthly

 
Data management
Database management systems
Types of databases
Data analysis
Databases